A series of occasional armed skirmishes and firefights have occurred along the Afghanistan–Pakistan border between the Afghan Armed Forces and the Pakistan Armed Forces since 1949. The latest round of hostilities between the two countries began in April 2007. Militants belonging to Tehrik-i-Taliban Pakistan and Jamaat-ul-Ahrar also use Afghanistan's territory to target Pakistani security personnel deployed along the border. The Diplomat says that the presence of terrorists belonging to Tehrik-i-Taliban Pakistan on Afghan soil is the reason for sporadic shelling of Afghanistan's territory by Pakistani security forces.

Background 
Hostilities existed between Afghanistan and the newly independent Pakistan since 1947, when Afghanistan became the only country to vote against the admission of Pakistan to the United Nations. Afghanistan advocated the independence of Pakistan's Khyber Pakhtunkhwa to form Pashtunistan, although the region's predominant Pashtun population had voted overwhelmingly in favor of Pakistan over India in the referendum held in July 1947. 99.02% votes were cast in favor of Pakistan. Afghan nationalists pressed for an independent state to be called Pashtunistan but the idea became unpopular. The Balochistan province of Pakistan was also included in the Greater Pastunistan definition to gain access to the Arabian sea in case Pakistan failed as a state, as Afghanistan had expected.

The International border between India and Afghanistan was established after the 1893 Durand Line Agreement between British Mortimer Durand of British India and Amir Abdur Rahman Khan of Afghanistan for fixing the limit of their respective spheres of influence. The single-page agreement, which contains seven short articles, was signed by Durand and Khan, agreeing not to exercise political interference beyond the frontier line between what was then the Emirate of Afghanistan and what was also then the British Indian Empire. The Durand Line was reaffirmed as the International Border between Afghanistan and India in the 1919 Anglo-Afghan War after the Afghan independence. The Afghans undertook to stop interference on the British side of the line in the subsequent Anglo-Afghan Treaty of 1919 in Rawalpindi.

Pakistan inherited the Durand Line agreement after its independence in 1947, but the Afghan Government has always refused to accept the Durand Line Agreement. Afghanistan has several times tried to seize Pakistan's western provinces of Balochistan and Khyber Pakhtunkhwa. The then Afghan Prime Minister, Muhammad Hashim, said "if an independent Pashtunistan cannot be set up, the frontier province should join Afghanistan. Our neighbor Pakistan will realize that our country, with its population and trade, needs an outlet to the sea, which is very essential", in an interview with the Statesman. In 1949, Pakistan Air Force bombed the Afghan sponsored militant camps in border areas including an Afghan village to curb an unrest led by Ipi Faqir propagating independent Pashtunistan. Border clashes were reported in 1949–50 for the first time. On 30 September 1950, Pakistan claimed that Afghan troops and tribesmen had crossed into Pakistan's Balochistan, but the low-scale invasion was repelled after six days of fighting. The Afghan government denied its involvement and claimed that they were pro-Pashtunistan Pashtun tribesmen.

Tensions soared with the Pakistani One Unit program, and both countries withdrew ambassadors and diplomatic staff in 1955. The Pakistani Embassy in Kabul and consulates in Kandhar and Jalalabad were attacked by mobs. In 1960, major skirmishes broke with the Afghan Forces massing out on the Afghan side of the border with tanks. These skirmishes saw the Pakistan Air Force bombarding Afghan forces. This bombardment led to a brief hiatus in the skirmishes. On 6 September 1961, Kabul formally severed diplomatic relations with Pakistan. In 1950 the House of Commons of the United Kingdom held its view on the Afghan-Pakistan dispute over the Durand Line by stating:

At the 1956 SEATO (Southeast Asia Treaty Organization) Ministerial Council Meeting held at Karachi, capital of Pakistan at the time, it was stated:

The Afghan government, having secured a treaty in December 1978 that allowed them to call on Soviet forces, repeatedly requested the introduction of troops in Afghanistan in the spring and summer of 1979. The 1979 Soviet–Afghan War forced millions of Afghans to take refuge inside Pakistan. Pakistani officials feared that the Soviet Union began some kind of military show down and that Pakistan or at least its Balochistan province was next on the Soviet agenda. During the early 1980s, multi-national mujahideen forces (consisting of about 100,000 fighters from forty different Muslim countries in addition to 150,000 local fighters) found support from the United States, Saudi Arabia, Pakistan, and Iran in the context of the Cold War. They were trained by Pakistani military in its frontier region around the Durand Line. The Soviet Union decided to withdraw in 1989 and when aid dried up on Afghanistan in 1992, a civil war began. This was followed by the rise and fall of the Taliban government. Since late 2001, as high as 140,000 NATO-led troops were stationed in Afghanistan to train Afghans and rebuild their war-torn country. In the meantime, the Taliban insurgency began around 2004. To counter the insurgency and bring stability in Afghanistan, the United States built bases and garrisons for the Afghan National Security Forces, and is using unmanned aerial vehicles to carry out drone attacks in Pakistan, mainly the Haqqani network in and around the Federally Administered Tribal Areas (FATA).

In September 2017, Brad Sherman, a US lawmaker, suggested conditioning US aid to Afghanistan to the recognition of Durand Line. He added:

Islamic Republic era skirmishes 
The following is an incomplete list of recent events relating to the Afghanistan–Pakistan skirmishes. Most of these events cannot be independently verified because news journalists usually have very limited access to reaching the areas where the fighting take place.
 13 May 2007 – An armed clash broke out between Pakistan Army and Afghan National Army. According to Afghan sources, clashes erupted when Pakistan Army established a border military post inside Afghan territory in Zazai district. While according to Pakistani officials, clashes erupted when Afghan soldiers opened firing on five to six border posts in Kurram tribal region in North-West Pakistan. Governor of Paktika province, Rahmatullah Rahmat, said that as many as 41 Afghans were either killed or injured in the clash. Other Afghans sources state that 13 Afghans (9 Afghan soldiers and 4 civilians) were killed. 3 soldiers of Pakistan Army were also injured in the clash.
 3 February 2011 – One Pakistani and 7 Afghan soldiers were killed and three others injured after a clash broke out along the border between Pakistani and Afghan forces including an Afghan Colonel. 3 Afghan Soldiers were also arrested by Pakistani Forces which were later returned. An Afghan commander in Khost confirmed the exchange of fire and alleged that the incident broke out after Pakistani troops in Waziristan opened fire towards Afghan police posts in Gurbuz District, claiming the Afghan engagement as retaliation. However, a Pakistani military official in Peshawar said that the Afghan troops fired on a Pakistan army check post in Ghulam Khan, North Waziristan and that the fire emanated from Afghan territory first. "We are responding with artillery and mortars," he added.
 June 2011 – Afghanistan blamed Pakistan for killing dozens of Afghan civilians in cross-border shelling conducted for several months. The Afghan government called for the immediate cessation of the artillery fire from Pakistan against Afghan villages. Afghan Army spokesman Mohammad Zahir Azimi said around 150 missiles fired from Pakistan had landed in different areas of Kunar province.
 July 2011 – Afghan officials alleged that around 42 Afghans were killed while another 48 were injured as a result of Pakistan military shelling in Nangarhar, Kunar and Nuristan provinces of Afghanistan. Afghan officials claim that the Pakistani military have been shelling these areas for the past five weeks. The attacks drew widespread condemnation from Afghan security officials and Tribal elders. In Kabul, around 200 people gathered to protest and condemn cross-border shelling and bombardment of eastern Afghanistan's provinces. However, Pakistan rejected Afghan government accusations, saying a "few accidental rounds may have been fired when it chased unknown militants who had crossed from Afghanistan and attacked its security installments". Moreover, Afghan Border Police officials also acknowledged the presence of terrorist belonging to Tehrik-i-Taliban (Pakistan) in areas where shelling took place. Afghan border police officials stated that after NATO forces had withdrawn from Kunar and Nangarhar provinces, terrorist belonging to Tehrik-i-Taliban (Pakistan) moved in behind fleeing Afghan civilians.
 19 July 2011 – Pakistani officials stated that over 20 mortar shells were fired from Afghanistan which killed 4 Pakistani soldiers and wounded another 2. Pakistan blamed the Afghan National Army for the attack.
 27 August 2011 – at least 2 Pakistani security personnel were killed and seven others injured in Chitral after militants crossed the border from Nuristan province and initiated firing. The Pakistani government blamed Afghanistan, saying since their expulsion from Pakistani tribal areas, militants were regrouping in Kunar and Nuristan with the support of local Afghan authorities.
 7 September 2011 – Protesters from Chitral staged a demonstration outside the Peshawar Press Club against an alleged continuous Taliban infiltration into Pakistan from Afghanistan, including the abduction of 30 Pakistani children a week ago on the day of Eid ul-Fitr. The protestors said they would stand against insurgents if their region was attacked in the future and blamed the Afghan government, insisting that Afghan authorities and NATO forces were failing to contain Afghanistan-based militants. The protestors also urged the need to increase the presence of border forces and called on the federal government to take up the issue with the Afghan government to avoid future incidents.
 25 September 2011 – Afghan authorities claimed that more than 340 rockets had been fired over the course of four days from Pakistani territory. The rockets damaged a few buildings, resulted in the death of a child and also forced hundreds to flee their homes. An employee from the Afghan Ministry of the Interior did not disclose the source of the cross-border shelling but said: "We call on Pakistan, whoever is behind the attacks, to prevent it immediately."
 10 October 2011 – Pakistani security forces stated that they killed 30 Afghan militants when a group of 200 militants from Afghanistan crossed the border into Pakistan. One Pakistani soldier was also killed in the clash.
 12 January 2012 – Pakistani Special Forces Troops from elite Special Services Group entered 4 to 5 km deep inside Afghan borders from Lower Dir area in pursuit of militants. Afghan Forces opened fire in retaliation, 11 Afghan Soldiers were killed in the exchange of fire. Pakistan immediately withdrew without any casualties. Afghanistan also blamed SSG Commandos for taking away the body of a killed Afghan Army Major.
 2 May 2013 – An armed clash took place between Pakistan and Afghan soldiers. The clash resulted in death of 1 Afghan Border Police officer. 2 Afghan border police personnel were also injured. While 2 personnel of Pakistan's Frontier Constabulary were also injured in the attack.
 8 June 2013 – Pakistan Army Aviation Bell AH-1 Cobra Gunship Helicopters crossed the border from North Waziristan into Paktia and hit 3 TTP Targets before returning.
31 May 2014 – Around 150 to 300 Militants belonging to Tehrik-i-Taliban (Pakistan) attacked a group of Pakistan military post at Nao top in Bajaur District. Pakistani military said that it successfully repelled the attack. In the attack 1 Pakistani soldiers and 16 militants belonging to Tehrik-i-Taliban were killed. According to Pakistani officials, gunship helicopters were also used to target Taliban positions in Afghanistan. Afghan defense minister General Bismillah Khan Mohammadi acknowledged that Pakistan military post was attacked by Talibans from Afghanistan side of the border. However, Afghan officials claim that the Pakistani gunship helicopters had crossed into Afghan territory. They claim that 4 Afghan civilians were killed and 10 others were injured as result of strikes conducted by those gunship helicopters.
4 June 2014 – Pakistani officials stated that terrorist from Afghanistan launched an attack on Pakistan's border post in Bajaur Agency. According to Pakistani officials, around 4 Pakistani soldiers were killed while 3 others were injured in the attack. Terrorist belonging to Tehrik-i-Taliban (Pakistan) were responsible for the attack. The attack was preceded by 31 May 2014 attack which also took place in Bajaur Agency. In the attack, 14 terrorist belonging to Tehrik-i-Taliban (Pakistan) were killed. Pakistani officials also stated that one of their border guard was killed while two others were injured. The attack by the terrorist on the border post was repelled successfully.
24 June 2014 – Afghan officials alleged that Pakistani soldiers have crossed the border and have conducted an attack on Afghan soldiers in Afghan territory. Afghan officials stated that the incursion took place in Kunar Province of Afghanistan and 3 Afghan National Army (ANA) soldiers and 8 Afghan civilians were killed in the attack.
 20 December 2014 – JF-17 Thunders from Pakistan Air Force Western Air Command flew into Afghanistan in Kunar Province and reportedly hit 27 targets. Air strikes were carried out in three phases throughout the night and reportedly 50 militants were killed. An Afghan soldier was also killed when an Afghan mobile patrol was mistakenly identified as a militant vehicle by Pakistani aircraft, SSG was also sent in to get the bodies of as many militants as possible. ANA troops did not retaliate against the Pakistani aircraft as the Ministry of Defence (Afghanistan) directed them not to engage Pakistani forces.
 23 August 2015 – Four Pakistani soldiers manning a border post were killed and four more injured in a rocket attack which originated from Afghanistan. The Pakistan military stated that it eliminated the group of militants responsible for the attack. This followed an attack on 16 and 17 August in which three Frontier Constabulary officers had also been killed.
 13–16 June 2016 – Pakistan and Afghan military clashed along the Torkham border for a period of three days. One Pakistan army Major, Ali Jawad Changezi, was injured in the clashes along Torkham border and later died in a hospital in Peshawar on 14 June. Four Pakistani border guards and nine civilians were also injured in the clashes that lasted for three days. According to Pakistan, Afghan army started unprovoked firing at roughly 9pm on Sunday to disrupt the construction of a gate 37 meters inside the Pakistani side of the border. The gate is designed to curb illegal cross-border movement and check the movement of terrorists, and is part of the greater under-construction Pakistan–Afghanistan barrier. The Torkham border crossing was forced to close due to skirmishes. According to Afghan officials, three Afghan soldiers and two Afghan civilians were killed as a result of Pakistan army firing. Seventeen Afghan soldiers were also reported to be injured in the three days clash. According to some reports Pakistan Army had captured three Afghan border outposts. On 15 June 2016, Pakistan restarted the construction of the border gate on the Torkham border.
 17–19 February 2017 – Over 48 hours, the Pakistani Army fired scores of missiles on Goshta District and Lal Pur District in Nangarhar province and Sirkanay District of Kunar province. Pakistani artillery rounds destroyed a dozen sites belonging to terrorist groups like Jamaat-ul-Ahrar and Tehrik-i-Taliban Pakistan, killing 15 to 20 terrorists and injuring many more. According to reports, Pakistan's cross-border shelling left more than 2,000 families homeless. This took place one day after the Sehwan suicide bombing in which ISIL-KP bombed the revered Sufi Shrine of Lal Shahbaz Qalandar in Pakistan's Sindh province, killing 91 people and wounding 300 others. The Afghan foreign ministry protested the shelling by Pakistan on its territory.
 5 March 2017 – Afghan officials claimed that Pakistan military has been shelling parts of Kunar province and Nangarhar province for the past two weeks. Afghan officials claim that 4 Afghan civilians were killed and dozen others were wounded in the shelling. Afghan reports claim that Pakistan military had fired more than 500 rockets which had in turn had made 500 families homeless.
 5 May 2017 – In the 2017 Afghanistan–Pakistan border skirmish, a Pakistani census team in Chaman was attacked by Afghan forces and in return Pakistani forces attacked the Afghan Army. At least seven Afghan soldiers and two Pakistani soldiers were killed, as well as at least two civilians. At least 30 civilians were wounded.
 5 April 2018 – Afghan government officials claim that the Pakistan Air Force had conducted airstrikes in Kunar province of Afghanistan which has caused 'huge financial losses' for the Afghan government. According to Afghan government officials, Pakistan Air Force dropped around four bombs within Afghanistan's territory. However, Pakistan officials rejected Afghan government allegations and termed them baseless. Pakistani officials stated that the Pakistan security forces were countering militants groups based in Afghanistan, who had launched attacks against the Pakistani security forces.
 15 April 2018 – Cross-border fire between the Pakistani Army and Afghan forces conducting routine "surveillance" in the Kurram Agency left two Pakistani soldiers dead and five others injured.
February 2019 – Afghan officials wrote to United Nation Security Council (UNSC) regarding consistent violation of Afghan territory by Pakistani security forces. Afghan officials claim that from 2012 to 2017, 82 Afghan people have been killed and 183 were injured as result of Pakistani security forces attacks.
3 April 2019 – An Afghan-based Kharoti tribe, clashed with Pakistan's Sulaimankhel tribe in Zarmailan area in Toykhula tehsil near the Pak-Afghan border. Reports suggest that clash broke out when members of the Afghan Kharoti tribe took up positions on the hilltop in Zarmailan area and started firing at the local population on the Pakistani side. In response, Pakistan's Sulaimankhel tribe, retaliated which forced Afghan Kharoti tribe to flee while leaving behind their weapons. Seven Afghan Kharoti were also injured in the clash. The Sulaimankhel tribe was led by Malik Ibrahim Jalalkhel, Gulbahar Khan Sulimankhel and other local elders.
1–2 May 2019 – On 1 May 2019, Pakistan military officials stated that around 70–80 terrorists from Afghanistan, launched attack on Pakistani soldiers who were constructing a border fence along the Pakistan-Afghanistan border. Pakistani military officials stated that they successfully repulsed the attack, killing scores of terrorists while forcing others to withdraw. In the clash, three Pakistani soldiers were also killed, while seven others were injured. Pakistan summoned the Afghan diplomat to lodge strong protests against the attack and urged the Afghan government to take action against the terrorists operating from the Afghan soil. On 2 May 2019, Afghan officials claimed that four Afghan civilians were killed and five others wounded as result of cross border shelling by Pakistani forces in Khost Province. Afghanistan summoned the Pakistani diplomat to protest over Pakistani military's "violation of Afghan Airspace and launching rockets" that caused casualties and damage.
21 September 2020 - 1 Pakistani soldier was killed during a cross border attack on a military checkpost in Bajaur District. According to a statement by the military, the shooting came from the Afghan side of the frontier.

After the Taliban's retook power of Afghanistan
26 August 2021 – A Pakistani soldier was killed in a cross border attack on a military checkpost in Lower Dir District. In response, Pakistan Army troops killed 2 terrorists and injured 3 others.
29 August 2021  – Gunfire from Afghanistan killed two Pakistani soldiers in Bajaur District in the second such incident since the Taliban took over Kabul. In retaliation the army said it killed 2-3 terrorists and injured 3-4 more.
24 December 2021  – A clash took place between Taliban forces and the Frontier Corps at several points along the Afghanistan-Pakistan border. According to Afghan villagers and tribal elders, Pakistani forces started shelling parts of Kunar province in response to firing by militants associated with Tehrik-i-Taliban Pakistan (TTP) on Pakistani soldiers deployed along the border. Soon after, the Afghan Taliban also started firing artillery targeting areas on Pakistan side of the border from Sarkano and Dangam districts of Kunar province. According to Afghan media outlets, one Afghan civilian was injured in the shelling and the areas affected by the Pakistani forces shelling were Dangam, Shaltan, Sarkano and Marawar districts of Kunar province. The shelling had also caused financial losses to the local residents, according to the Afghan media. No loss of life was reported on the Pakistan's side.
6 February 2022 – Five Pakistani troops are killed after "militants from inside Afghanistan" opened fire on a border post in Kurram District, Khyber Pakhtunkhwa. The army says that it retaliated, causing heavy casualties among the militants. The Taliban government denies that the firing came from within Afghan territory.
24 February 2022– Pakistan and Taliban forces clashed in Spin boldak area with each side accusing the other of initiating the fire fight. Two civilians were killed and six others were injured on the Afghanistan's side as result of the clash. No loss of life was reported on the Pakistan's side. The Taliban spokesman announced that the situation in the area is under control now and that they will investigate further to why the two sides clashed.
April 2022  – On 9 April 2022, clashes occurred between the Pakistani border guards and the Islamic Emirate Army in Nimruz Province, Afghanistan. The casualties were unstated. On 15 April 2022, Pakistani soldiers again reportedly clashed with Taliban forces around 9 p.m in Gurbuz District, Khost Province, killing two Taliban fighters. This led to Pakistani airstrikes in Afghan provinces of Khost and Kunar killing unknown numbers of TTP militants as claimed by Pakistani media.
13 September 2022 – In the border area of Afghanistan's Paktia province and Pakistan's Kurram province, gunfire was exchanged between Taliban and Pakistani forces, resulting in casualties on both sides. The Taliban alleged that Pakistani forces were attempting to build a military outpost near the border, which Taliban spokesperson Balal Karimi said was against the "rules". Karimi further alleged that Taliban forces were fired upon when they approached the Pakistani troops for questioning. The Pakistan Armed Forces released a statement saying that terrorists had "opened fire upon Pakistani troops" across the border.
13 November 2022 - During the early morning of 13 November, Taliban and Pakistani Border Guards exchanged gunfire at the Spin Boldak-Chama border crossing in Southern Kandahar. 1 Pakistani guard was killed, while another 2 were injured. The Taliban has stated that it had no casualties during the skirmish.  The crossing was closed for indefinite period after the skirmish.
11 December 2022 - At least six civilians have been killed by firing from Afghan forces near the Chaman border. According to the Inter-Services Public Relations (ISPR), heavy weapons including artillery and mortars were used in the firing by Afghan forces. Pakistan fired missiles in retaliation killing one Afghan soldier.
15 December 2022 - One civilian was killed and 11 injured when Taliban forces shelled the Chaman border crossing with mortars.
19 February 2023 - The Afghan Taliban fired with Pakistani border guards and shut border crossing Torkham.

References 

Afghanistan–Pakistan border
Conflicts in 1949
1950s conflicts
1960s conflicts
1970s conflicts
1980s conflicts
1990s conflicts
2000s conflicts
2010s conflicts
2020s conflicts
Wars involving Afghanistan
Wars involving Pakistan